Bronson Township may refer to:

 Bronson Township, Michigan
 Bronson Township, Huron County, Ohio

Township name disambiguation pages